Lindsay Lee-Waters and Megan Moulton-Levy were the defending champions, having won the event in 2012, but both players chose not to participate.

Raquel Kops-Jones and Abigail Spears won the title, defeating Verónica Cepede Royg and Inés Ferrer Suárez in the final, 6–1, 6–3.

Seeds

Draw

References 
 Draw

The Oaks Club Challenger - Doubles